Shubhayathra is a 1990 Indian Malayalam-language romantic drama film directed by Kamal and written by P. R. Nathan. Starring Jayaram and Parvathy in the lead roles, and Innocent, K. P. A. C. Lalitha, Mamukkoya and Jagadeesh in other pivotal roles, the film examines the life of middle-class Malayalee families in the city of Mumbai.

Plot
Vishnu and Arundhathi, working in Mumbai, meet each other at their common friend, Raman's house. They fall in love at first sight and get married. The film is their struggle to lead a family life and to find an accommodation in a city like Mumbai.

Cast
 Jayaram as Vishnu
 Parvathy as Arundhathi
 Dan Dhanoa as Sherkhan
 Innocent as Raman, aka Ramettan
 KPAC Lalitha as Raman's Wife
 Mamukkoya as Kareem bhai
 Jagadeesh as Rajendran
 Siddique as Sudhakaran, Vishnu's Friend
 Sukumari as Hostel Warden
 Oduvil Unnikrishnan as Thirumulpadu, Tea seller
 Paravoor Bharathan as Vishnu's father
 Zainuddin as Vishnu's Friend
 Priyadarshini as Raman's Child
 Dhivyadharshini as Raman's Child
 Mansoor Ali Khan

Soundtrack
The film's music has been composed by Johnson with lyrics by P. K. Gopi. The soundtrack album features five songs.

 "Kinaavinte Koodin" — G. Venugopal
 "Kinaavinte Koodin" — K. S. Chithra
 "Mizhiyilenthe" — G. Venugopal & K. S. Chithra
 "Sindooram Thookum" — Unni Menon & Sujatha

References

External links
 
 Shubhayathra at the Malayalam Movie Database
 Shubhayathra at Metromatinee.com

1990 films
Films scored by Johnson
1990s Malayalam-language films
1990 romantic drama films
Indian romantic drama films
Films directed by Kamal (director)